was a Japanese mathematician. He was a leading member of the Japanese school of homotopy theory, following in the tradition of Hiroshi Toda.

Nishida received his Ph.D. from Kyoto University in 1973, after spending the 1971–72 academic year at the University of Manchester in England. He then became a professor at Kyoto University in 1990. His proof in 1973 of Michael Barratt's conjecture (that positive-degree elements in the stable homotopy ring of spheres are nilpotent) was a major breakthrough: following Frank Adams' solution of the Hopf invariant one problem, it marked the beginning of a new global understanding of algebraic topology.

His contributions to the field were celebrated in 2003 at the NishidaFest in Kinosaki, followed by a satellite conference at the Nagoya Institute of Technology; the proceedings were published in Geometry and Topology's monograph series. In 2000 he was the leading organizer for a concentration year at the Japan–US Mathematics Institute at Johns Hopkins University.

Nishida's earliest work grew out of the study of infinite loop spaces; his first paper (in 1968, on what came eventually to be known as the Nishida relations) accounts for interactions between Steenrod operations and Kudo–Araki (Dyer–Lashof) operations. Some of his later work concerns a circle of ideas surrounding the Segal conjecture, transfer homomorphisms, and stable splittings of classifying spaces of groups. The ideas in this series of papers have by now grown into a rich subfield of homotopy theory; it continues today in (for example) the theory of p-compact groups.

References 

 G. Nishida, The nilpotency of elements of the stable homotopy groups of spheres. J. Math. Soc. Jpn. 25 (1973) 707–732
 Michael J. Hopkins, Global methods in homotopy theory, in Homotopy theory (Durham, 1985), 73-96, London Math. Soc. Lecture Notes 117, Cambridge Univ. Press, Cambridge, 1987
 V. Voevodsky, A nilpotence theorem for cycles algebraically equivalent to zero. Internat. Math. Res. Notices 4 (1995) 187–198 
 Proceedings of the International Meeting and its Satellite Conference on Homotopy Theory, dedicated to Goro Nishida, held in Kinosaki, July 28–August 1 and August 4–8, 2003. Geometry & Topology Monographs, 10. Geometry & Topology Publications, Coventry, 2007
 G. Nishida Stable homotopy type of classifying spaces of finite groups. Algebraic and topological theories (Kinosaki, 1984) 391–404, Kinokuniya, Tokyo, 1986

External links
 The nilpotency of elements of the stable homotopy groups of spheres by Goro NISHIDA (Received Feb. 16, 1973)
Modular forms and the double transfer for BT2 by Goro NISHIDA (Received October 8, 1990) / J-Stage

1943 births
2014 deaths
20th-century Japanese mathematicians
21st-century Japanese mathematicians
Kyoto University alumni
Alumni of the University of Manchester
Topologists
Academic staff of Kyoto University